Lauri Pyykönen (born 20 April 1978 in Pirkkala) is a Finnish cross-country skier who competed from 1998 to 2008. His best World Cup finish was second twice, both in sprint events with one each in 2002 and in 2003.

At the 2006 Winter Olympics in Turin, Pyykönen finished fifth in the team sprint, 27th in the individual sprint, and 54th in the 15 km events. His best finish at the FIS Nordic World Ski Championships was 12th in the sprint event at Val di Fiemme in 2003.

Cross-country skiing results
All results are sourced from the International Ski Federation (FIS).

Olympic Games

World Championships

World Cup

Season standings

Individual podiums
2 podiums – (2 )

References

1978 births
Living people
People from Pirkkala
Cross-country skiers at the 2006 Winter Olympics
Finnish male cross-country skiers
Olympic cross-country skiers of Finland
Sportspeople from Pirkanmaa
21st-century Finnish people